Wilbert Suvrijn (born 26 October 1962) is a Dutch former professional footballer. Mainly a central defender, he could also operate as a defensive midfielder.

Club career
Suvrijn was born in Sittard, Limburg. In his country, he represented hometown's Fortuna Sittard (winning promotion to the Eredivisie in his debut season, as champions) and Roda JC, playing in a total of 209 games in the top division over the course of seven seasons. With the latter club, he scored twice in 31 matches in 1986–87, helping it finish fourth and qualify for the UEFA Cup.

In 1989, Suvrijn signed with French side Montpellier HSC, helping them win the domestic cup in his first year – he missed the final due to injury – and contributing decisively to the team's sixth place in Ligue 1 in 1991–92, playing almost exclusively in midfield. After only nine matches in the following campaign, mainly due to back problems, the 30-year-old decided to retire, staying closely related to France, and became a players agent.

International career
Suvrijn made his debut for the Netherlands on 29 April 1986, coming on as a substitute for Michel Valke in a friendly with Scotland (0–0) as Rinus Michels was the manager. He went on to earn nine full caps in two years, being called to the squad for UEFA Euro 1988 in West Germany.

Suvrijn appeared in two games for the eventual champions in the finals, totalling four minutes: in the group stage 3–1 win over England he replaced Marco van Basten, scorer of all of the team's goals in the match. In the semi-finals against the hosts (2–1), he played the last minute in the place of injured Erwin Koeman.

References

External links
Roda archives 

1962 births
Living people
People from Sittard
Dutch footballers
Association football defenders
Association football midfielders
Association football utility players
Eredivisie players
Eerste Divisie players
Fortuna Sittard players
Roda JC Kerkrade players
Ligue 1 players
Montpellier HSC players
Netherlands international footballers
UEFA Euro 1988 players
UEFA European Championship-winning players
Dutch expatriate footballers
Expatriate footballers in France
Dutch expatriate sportspeople in France
Dutch sports agents
Association football agents
Footballers from Limburg (Netherlands)